Sattleria cottiella is a moth in the family Gelechiidae. It was described by Peter Huemer and Paul D. N. Hebert in 2011. It is found in the southern Cottian Alps of Italy.

References

Sattleria
Moths described in 2011